Dirona picta, common name colorful dirona, is a species of sea slug, an Eastern Pacific Ocean nudibranch, a marine, opisthobranch gastropod mollusk in the family Dironidae.

Distribution
This marine species occurs from Northern Oregon, USA to Baja California Sur, Mexico. Also reported from Japan.

References

 Farmer, W. M. & C. L. Collier. 1963. Notes on the Opisthobranchia of Baja California, Mexico, with range extensions. The Veliger, 6(2): 62-63.
 Goddard, J.H.R. 1987. Observations on the opisthobranch mollusks of Punta Gorda, California, with notes on the distribution and biology of Crimora coneja. The Veliger, 29(3): 267-273.
 Goddard, J. H. R. 1992. Patterns of development in nudibranch molluscs from the northeast Pacific Ocean, with regional comparisons. Ph.D. Dissertation, University of Oregon, Eugene, Oregon.
 Goddard, J. H. R. 1997. Range extensions of eight northeastern Pacific nudibranchs.Opisthobranch Newsletter, 23(4): 13.
 Goddard, J.H.R. 1998. A summary of the prey of nudibranch molluscs from Cape Arago, Oregon. Opisthobranch Newsletter, 24(2): 11-14.
 McDonald, G.W. 1983. A review of the nudibranchs of the California coast. Malacologia, 24(1-2): 114-276.
 McDonald, G.R. & J.W. Nybakken. 1978. Additional notes on the food of some California nudibranchs with a summary of known food habits of California species. The Veliger, 21(1): 110-119.
 Turgeon, D.; Quinn, J.F.; Bogan, A.E.; Coan, E.V.; Hochberg, F.G.; Lyons, W.G.; Mikkelsen, P.M.; Neves, R.J.; Roper, C.F.E.; Rosenberg, G.; Roth, B.; Scheltema, A.; Thompson, F.G.; Vecchione, M.; Williams, J.D. (1998). Common and scientific names of aquatic invertebrates from the United States and Canada: mollusks. 2nd ed. American Fisheries Society Special Publication, 26. American Fisheries Society: Bethesda, MD (USA). . IX, 526 + cd-rom pp.

External links
 Behrens David W., 1980, Pacific Coast Nudibranchs: a guide to the opisthobranchs of the northeastern Pacific, Sea Challenger Books, California

Dirona
Gastropods described in 1941